Henriette Goverdine Anna "Jet" Roland Holst-van der Schalk (24 December 1869 – 21 November 1952) was a Dutch poet and communist. She was nominated for the Nobel Prize in Literature.

The poet Adriaan Roland Holst (1888–1976), nicknamed "the Dutch Prince of Poets", was the nephew of her husband.

Early life
Born in Noordwijk on 24 December 1869, Roland Holst was brought up in the affluent, liberal Christian family of the notary Theodore Willem van der Schalk and Anna Ida van der Schalk-van der Hoeven. Roland Holst attended four years of boarding school in Velp and studied French in Liege.

Roland Holst soon came to develop a talent as a poet. She married the artist Richard Roland Holst in 1896 and befriended the poet Herman Gorter, who prompted her to read Das Kapital by Karl Marx. Around this time she became politically active and began her career as a writer on political, historical and philosophical fields.

Poetry
Around 1890, Henriette met Albert Verwey, who with Willem Kloos was among the leaders of the Tachtigers and the founders of De Nieuwe Gids. In 1892 she met the painter Jan Toorop. She wrote about Toorop and Verwey in her first sonnets. In these poems she showcased her intense needs as an artist, more precisely: as a poet.

Socialism

At the age of 27 Roland Holst joined the SDAP. She was then working night after night in smoky halls calling for workers' struggle to improve their miserable fate. She became part of the party leadership and, in 1900, was delegated to the Second International. At the conferences of the International, she came into contact with prominent Marxists such as Karl Liebknecht, Rosa Luxemburg, and Leon Trotsky.

In 1911, Roland Holst had joined as an orthodox Marxist in the SDAP. Unlike most other orthodox Marxists, she did not immediately move over to the Social-Democratic Party (SDP, later known as the Communist Party of the Netherlands [CPN]). Against the advice of Rosa Luxemburg in some years she remained non-partisan. She founded in 1915, along with a number of SDAP and SDP members, the Revolutionair Socialistische Vereeniging. While in the CPN, she sided with Herman Gorter, Anton Pannekoek, and the left communist fraction of the party.

"Rode Jet" (meaning "Red Jet", a nickname of Roland Holst) also played a role during the revolutionary turmoil of November 1918. On 13 November she went with David Wijnkoop at the head of a procession on the Orange-Nassau barracks in Amsterdam, to celebrate the brotherhood with the hussars. Intervention by the security forces resulted in two dead, the only victims of the "revolution that did not happen".

1928–1952: Christian socialist
Henriette had deep slumps. She suffered from depression, bouts of anorexia, anemia and heart disease but when she was well she struggled with an unrelenting zeal to improve the position of workers, youth, and women.

Her first poems were passionately for socialism. She wrote among other things, the Dutch text for the anthem "The Internationale". Later, her work took a more religious character. Among her writings were plays, biographies (of Rousseau, Gandhi and Tolstoy), journalism, and radio plays.

During the Second World War she was active in the Dutch resistance, as editor of the resistance magazine De Vonk, then De Vlam. Though of a well to do background, she was certainly not a "salon socialist".

At the end of her life she wrote the autobiography Het vuur brandde voort. She died in Amsterdam on 21 November 1952 at the age of 82. A bust was placed in her memory in her birthplace of Noordwijk in 1969.

Works

Poetry collections 
 het Jeugdwerk (1884–1892) (was published in 1969 by Garmt Stuiveling).
 Sonnetten en Verzen in Terzinen geschreven; original edition (graphical treatment by Richard Roland Holst) and Scheltema Holkema's Bookshop, Amsterdam, 1896.
Reprinted in simpler form of being. WL and J. Brusse, Rotterdam in 1913 and 1922 and out. BZZTôH, The Hague 1983.

Political work 

 Kapitaal en Arbeid in Nederland, Amsterdam 1902.
 De groote spoorwegstaking, de vakbeweging en de SDAP, Den Haag 1903.
 the Dutch railroad strikes of 1903, and the role of unions and of the SDAP therein.
 Algemeene werkstaking en sociaaldemocratie, Rotterdam 1906.
 this work appeared in German in 1905, with a preface by Karl Kautsky.
 De opstandelingen, Een lyrisch treurspel in drie bedrijven, Amsterdam 1910.
 a lyrical work on the 1905 Russian Revolution.
 De philosophie van Dietzgen en hare beteekenis voor het proletariaat, Rotterdam 1910.
 First published in German, translated by Sam de Wolff.
 Revisionistische en Marxistische tactiek in de kiesrecht-beweging, Rotterdam 1910.
 polemic against revisionist socialism of Troelstra with regard to voting rights.
 De strijdmiddelen der sociale revolutie, Amsterdam 1918.
 De revolutionaire massa-aktie. Een studie, Rotterdam 1918.
 De daden der Bolschewiki, Amsterdam 1919.
 written in defense of the Bolsheviks.
 Verslag van het Derde Internationale Communistische Congres, 1921.
 the third congress of the Comintern.
 Uit Sowjet-Rusland, 1921.
 description of her trip to the Third International
 Communisme en moraal, Arnhem 1925.
 Herman Gorter, Amsterdam 1933.
 biography of Tachtiger Herman Gorter.
 Rosa Luxemburg. Haar leven en werk, Rotterdam 1935.
 biography of Rosa Luxemburg.

Notes

References

Further reading 
 Jaap van Praag (1911–1981) wrote the first biography of Henriette Roland Holst.
 Herman Schaap - Het leed der mensheid laat mij vaak niet slapen (1984), an anthology from the prose of Henriette Roland Holst, with introduction and notes.
 Elsbeth Etty - Liefde is heel het leven niet (1996). A biography of Roland Holst.

External links 
 The Communist Left and the resolutions of the second congress of the Communist International - Henriette Roland-Holst, a left communist text by Roland Holst
 Schalk, Henriette Goverdine Anna van der (1869–1952), Biografisch Woordenboek van Nederland
 Biographies, works and texts in the Digitale Bibliotheek voor de Nederlandse Letteren
 Schalk, Henriette Goverdine Anna van der, Biografisch Woordenboek van het Socialisme en de Arbeidersbeweging in Nederland
 Archief Henriëtte Roland Holst-van der Schalk at the International Institute of Social History
 Tussen droom en werkelijkheid. De betekenis van het 'Russische communisme' voor het 'Utopia' van Henriette Roland Holst, doctoral thesis of 1996 of Emma Binnendijk

Poems by Henriette Roland Holst Online 
 De zachte krachten zullen zeker winnen (met een uitvoerige bespreking door Pim Heuvel) , Klassiekegedichten.net
 Ook ik ben omstreeks ’t midden mijner dagen (besproken door Elly Woltjes) , Klassiekegedichten.net
 Enkele gedichten , Spiritualiteit.net
 Gedenk mij in uw gebeden! (ook te beluisteren in een gezongen versie) en Over het ontwaken mijner ziel Poëtisch Liedgenootschap

1869 births
1952 deaths
19th-century Dutch poets
19th-century Dutch women writers
20th-century Dutch poets
20th-century Dutch women writers
Christian communists
Communist Party of the Netherlands politicians
Communist poets
Communist women writers
Council communists
Dutch Christian pacifists
Dutch Christian socialists
Dutch communists
19th-century Dutch dramatists and playwrights
Dutch journalists
Dutch resistance members
Dutch women poets
Female Christian socialists
People from Noordwijk
People with mood disorders
Social Democratic Workers' Party (Netherlands) politicians
Dutch women dramatists and playwrights
Female resistance members of World War II
20th-century Dutch dramatists and playwrights